Flowers in Fog (Chinese: 花非花雾非雾) is a 2013 Chinese television series written by Taiwanese novelist Chiung Yao. It is Chiung's first original screenplay after My Fair Princess (1998). The series was partially shot in Brittany, France. Starring an ensemble cast from China, Taiwan and South Korea, the series premiered on 6 August 2013 on Hunan TV.

Synopsis
Xue Hua, Lang Hua, Huo Hua and Yan Hua are four orphans who grew up together at the Hua Xin Orphan Center. Each girl possessed outstanding musical talent and the sisters shared a tight bond. However, when Xue Hua was 15, she was found by her aunt who took her to France. Huo Hua is also adopted by a family. From then on, Lang Hua and Yan Hua promised each other to never be separated.

Sixteen years later, Huo Hua (now called Ye Fan), heads to France to search for Xue Hua. There, she falls in love with Qi Fei, a handsome and talented cello player. However, Huo Hua later finds out that Xue Hua was suspected to be dead and the prime suspect was none other than her boyfriend Qi Yuan, also the brother of Qi Fei. She thus tries to find out the truth about Xue Hua and began to seek revenge.

Meanwhile, Lang Hua (now called Bai Hai Hua) becomes a special nurse at the Geng's family special nursing center. There, she meets Geng Ke Yi and his son, Geng Ruo Chen. While helping take care of old Mr Geng, Lang Hua also helps father and son to mend their estranged relationship. In the process, she falls in love with Ruo Chen.

Yan Hua (now known as Bai Meng Hua), who has been protected by her elder sister Hai Hua since young, has a cheerful and attractive personality. She is being pursued by her colleagues, Xu Hao and Han Li at the same time; leading to interesting anecdotes.

Cast
Li Sheng as Ye Fan (Huo Hua)
Zhang Rui as Qi Fei
Ruby Lin as Xue Hua
Guan Xiaotong as young Xue Hua
Joo Jin-mo as Qi Yuan
Wan Qian as Bai Hai Hua (Lang Hua)
Yao Yuanhao as Geng Ruo Chen
Yang Zi as Bai Meng Hua (Yan Hua)
Deng Lun as Xu Hao
Gao Zi Qi as Han Li 
Liu De Kai as Geng Ke Yi
Madina Memet as Beth
Han Cheng Yu as An Ting Wei
Fang Qing Zhuo as Xu Ma Ma
Zhang Ying as Du Qiu Shui
Song Zi Qiao as Ji Ai Xia
Zhao Wei as Geng Pei Zhong
Xiong Xiao Wen as Zhou Wen Juan
Dai Yan Ni as Qin En

Soundtrack

Ratings 

 Highest ratings are marked in red, lowest ratings are marked in blue

References

External links
  Flowers in Fog on Sina.com

2013 Chinese television series debuts
2013 Chinese television series endings
Chinese romance television series
Taiwanese romance television series
Taiwanese drama television series
Television shows based on works by Chiung Yao